The Lunar Magma Ocean (LMO) is the layer of molten rock that is theorized to have been present on the surface of the Moon. The Lunar Magma Ocean was likely present on the Moon from the time of the Moon's formation (about 4.5 or 4.4 billion years ago) to tens or hundreds of millions years after that time. It is a thermodynamic consequence of the Moon's relatively rapid formation in the aftermath of a giant impact between the proto-Earth and another planetary body. As the Moon accreted from the debris from the giant impact, gravitational potential energy was converted to thermal energy. Due to the rapid accretion of the Moon (in about a month to a year), thermal energy was trapped since it did not have sufficient time to thermally radiate away energy through the lunar surface. The subsequent thermochemical evolution of the Lunar Magma Ocean explains the Moon's largely anorthositic crust, europium anomaly, and KREEP material.

The Lunar Magma Ocean was initially proposed by two groups in 1970 after they analyzed anorthositic rock fragments found in the Apollo 11 sample collection. Wood et al. used fragments of bulk sample 10085 for their analyses. Ferroan anorthosite rocks found during the Apollo program are composed primarily (over 90%) of the mineral plagioclase. More specifically, ferroan anorthosite rocks found on the Moon consist of the calcium (Ca) end-member of plagioclase (i.e., anorthite). This suggests that at least upper layers of the Moon were molten in the past due to the purity of lunar anorthosites and the fact that anorthite generally has a high crystallization temperature.

Initial state 

There are three important parameters when considering the initial state of the Lunar Magma Ocean: chemical composition, depth, and temperature. These three parameters largely determine the thermochemical evolution. For the Lunar Magma Ocean, there are uncertainties associated with each of these initial conditions. A typical initial chemical composition is 47.1% SiO2, 33.1% MgO, 12.0% FeO, 4.0% Al2O3, and 3.0% CaO (with minor contributions from other molecules), along with an initial depth of 1,000 km and a basal temperature of 1,900 K.

Initial chemical composition and depth 
Initial chemical composition of the Lunar Magma Ocean is estimated based on the chemistry of lunar samples, along with the chemical composition and thickness of the current lunar crust. For computer modeling purposes, the initial chemical composition is typically defined by weight percent based on a system of basic molecules such as SiO2, MgO, FeO, Al2O3, and CaO. Seven example initial chemical compositions of the Lunar Magma Ocean from the literature are shown in the figure to the right. These compositions are generally similar to the composition of the Earth's mantle with the main difference being some (e.g., Taylor Whole Moon) or no enhancement (e.g., Lunar Primitive Upper Mantle) of refractory elements.

The estimated initial depth of the Lunar Magma Ocean varies from 100 km to the radius of the Moon.

Crystallization sequence 
Exact sequence of minerals that crystallize out of the Lunar Magma Ocean depends on the initial state of the Lunar Magma Ocean (viz. chemical composition, depth, and temperature). Following the idealized Bowen's Reaction Series, olivine is generally expected to crystallize first, followed by orthopyroxene. These minerals are denser than the surrounding magma and thus sink towards the bottom of the Lunar Magma Ocean. As such, the Lunar Magma Ocean is initially expected to solidify from the bottom up. After about 80% of the Lunar Magma Ocean has crystallized, the mineral plagioclase crystallizes along with other minerals. Rocks that are primarily made of plagioclase (i.e., anorthosite) form and float towards the surface of the Moon making the primordial crust of the Moon.

Duration 
The Lunar Magma Ocean may have lasted tens to hundreds of millions of years after the Moon's formation. The Moon is estimated to have formed between 52 and 152 million years after calcium-aluminum-rich inclusions (CAIs), the oldest known solids in the Solar System that serve as a proxy for its age of 4.567Ga. The exact formation time of the Lunar Magma Ocean is somewhat uncertain. 

End points may be indicated by the age of ferroan anorthosite (FAN) sample 60025 (4.360±0.003 Ga) and the estimated age of ur-KREEP (4.368±0.029 Ga). If the Moon formed early (i.e., 52 million years after Solar System formation) and both samples indicate full Lunar Magma Ocean crystallization, then the Lunar Magma Ocean would have lasted for about 155 million years. In this case, computer models show that one or more heat sources (such as tidal heating) are required to prolong crystallization of the Lunar Magma Ocean.

If the Moon formed late (i.e., 152 million years after Solar System formation) then again using the ferroan anorthosite sample 60025's age and the estimated age of ur-KREEP, the Lunar Magma Ocean lasted for about 55 million years. Meaning the Lunar Magma Ocean was not prolonged by one or more additional heat sources.

In the past, the age difference between the oldest and youngest ferroan anorthosite samples were used to determine the duration of the Lunar Magma Ocean. This was problematic due to the large errors of sample ages and due to some sample ages being reset by impacts. For instance, the oldest ferroan anorthosite sample is 67016 with a Sm-Nd age of 4.56±0.07 Ga and the youngest is 62236 with a Sm-Nd age of 4.29±0.06 Ga. The difference between these ages is 270 million years. This would again mean that the Lunar Magma Ocean had an additional heat source, such as tidal heating.

Zircon analysis of Apollo 14 samples suggests the lunar crust differentiated 4.51±0.01 billion years ago, indicating lunar formation 50 million years after the beginning of the Solar System.

Refuting evidence 

One of the alternative models to the Lunar Magma Ocean model is the Serial Magmatism model.

References

Lunar science
Moon
Pre-Nectarian